Luk Chau Village is a village located on the northeast coast of Lamma Island, the third largest island in the territory of Hong Kong.

Administration
Luk Chau is a recognized village under the New Territories Small House Policy.

History
Its original inhabitants of the villages were farmers and fishermen. They originated from Xixiang, Baoan in today's Shenzhen.

At the time of the 1911 census, the population of Luk Chau was 54. The number of males was 16. As of 2018, the village was home to a dozen families.

Features
A Tin Hau Temple, built in 1868, is located in Luk Chau Village. Other deities are worshipped in the temple,  including Pak Tai, Lung Mo, Kwan Tai and the Earth God.

Access
Luk Chau can be access by speedboat from Aberdeen (15-minute ride) and by foot from Sok Kwu Wan (40 minutes).

References

External links

 Delineation of area of existing village Luk Chau (Lamma South) for election of resident representative (2019 to 2022)
 Antiquities Advisory Board. Pictures of the Tin Hau Temple

Villages in Islands District, Hong Kong
Lamma Island
Populated places in Hong Kong
Islands of Hong Kong